2nd Avenue is No Justice's third studio album and fourth overall. It was released on July 6, 2010, with the band's third line-up.

Track listing

Personnel 

Armando Lopez – drums
Johnny Cooper – backing vocals
Joe Costa – engineer
Mike Daly – dobro
Adam Fluhrer – guitar
Jon Folk – artist direction
Paul Gordon – harmonica, keyboards
Dexter Green – guitar, percussion, backing vocals, producer, engineer, mixing
Jimmy Hamilton – live mixing
Rebecca Lynn Howard – backing vocals
Clint Ingersoll – backing vocals
Jerry Payne – guitar
Joey Trevino – bass guitar
Nick Lashley – guitar
Cody Patton 
Steven Rice – guitar, vocals, backing vocals
Matt Slocum – cello
Scott Welch – artist direction

Chart performance

References

No Justice albums
2010 albums